James Smith 100 is an Indian reserve of the James Smith Cree Nation in Saskatchewan. It is 58 kilometers east of Prince Albert. In the 2016 Canadian Census, it recorded a population of 743 living in 152 of its 152 total private dwellings. In the same year, its Community Well-Being index was calculated at 46 of 100, compared to 58.4 for the average First Nations community and 77.5 for the average non-Indigenous community.

References

Indian reserves in Saskatchewan
Division No. 15, Saskatchewan